Manganese phosphate may refer to:

Manganese(II) phosphate, 
Manganese violet, a Manganese(III) ammonium pyrophosphate used as a pigment 

Minerals
Gatehouseite, 
Hureaulite, 
Purpurite,  with varying amounts of iron depending upon its source
Waterhouseite, 

With Li or Na only
Lithiophilite, 
Natrophilite, 
Triphylite,  end member of solid solutions with lithiophilite

With Al or B only
Eosphorite, 
Seamanite, rare boron phosphate mineral, 
Sinkankasite, 

Mixed phosphate minerals with iron

Alluaudite, 
Childrenite, rare,  
Falsterite, rare, 
Ferraioloite, rare, . It is related to falsterite.
Graftonite, 
Maneckiite, rare, 
Messelite, 
Robertsite, 
Samuelsonite, 
Switzerite, 
Triplite, rare, 
Triploidite, uncommon, 
Whiteite is a rare hydrated phosphate mineral, with hydroxyl, Fe, Ca